Brossard-Chevrier Park and Ride is an Exo public transit (Exo) bus terminal with an incentive parking lot located in Brossard, Quebec, Canada.

It is served by bus 90 of the Réseau de transport de Longueuil (RTL) and is located at 4700 rue Lapinière in the C section of Brossard at the crossing of rue Lapinière and the CN railway tracks. It connects to Autoroute 10 nearby via a reserved bus lane accessed through a tunnel.

Park-n-Ride service began on September 8, 1998. It has 1974 free parking spaces, 15 bike racks and 24 reserved handicapped parking spaces. Until April 7, 2008 service was restricted to Monday-Friday until 22:30.  As of April 7, 2008 service has been extended to 01:00 and weekends. It can be accessed via exit 9 or 11 from Autoroute 10 and exit 10 from Autoroute 30.

Connecting bus routes

See also 
 ARTM park and ride lots

References

External links

Exo bus stations
Transport in Brossard
Parking facilities